Elliot Vélez (born April 24, 1988 San Juan) is a Puerto Rican footballer who currently plays for Criollos de Caguas FC.

Career

National team
At the age of 22, Elliot made his first appearance to the senior Puerto Rico National football team on Oct 6, 2010; against the Cayman Islands in Caribbean Cup Qualification where Puerto Rico won the match 2-0.

References

External links

1988 births
Living people
People from Río Piedras, Puerto Rico
Puerto Rican footballers
Sevilla FC Puerto Rico players
USL Championship players
Puerto Rico international footballers
Association football forwards